Mike Robinson is a retired American soccer forward who played one season for the Philadelphia Fury in the North American Soccer League.

Michael Robinson was the starting striker for the 1974 & 1975 North Catholic PCL Champions. Robinson scored the first goal in the ’75 PCL final to help North defeat St Joe’s Prep by a score of 2-1 in Overtime. In ’75 he also led the Falcon squad to a City title by scoring 2 goals in the first 15 minutes on the way to a 4-0 Falcon victory over Roxborough High School. He was voted 1st team All-Catholic in 1974 & 75. He was also an All-Scholastic selection after his senior season.

Mike was recruited out of NC by NSCAA Hall of Famer Tom Fleck to play College soccer at Lehigh University. Robinson was a star athlete from the 1977 through the 1980 season. Mike still ranks #2 All-time in goals scored during his career at Lehigh with 41. He also played on the 1978 Lehigh squad that was 12-2-3, which is the 2nd highest in winning percentage all-time at Lehigh for one season.

External links
 NASL/MISL stats

1958 births
Living people
American soccer players
North American Soccer League (1968–1984) players
Philadelphia Fury (1978–1980) players
Soccer players from Philadelphia
Association football forwards